The 2012–13 All-Ireland Intermediate Club Hurling Championship was the ninth staging of the All-Ireland Intermediate Club Hurling Championship since its establishment by the Gaelic Athletic Association in 2004.

The All-Ireland final was played on 10 February 2013 at Croke Park in Dublin, between Clara from Kilkenny and St. Gabriel's from London. Clara won the match by 1-16 to 0-13 to claim their first All-Ireland title.

Results

Leinster Intermediate Club Hurling Championship

Quarter-finals

Semi-final

Final

Munster Intermediate Club Hurling Championship

Quarter-finals

Semi-finals

Final

All-Ireland Intermediate Club Hurling Championship

Final

References

All-Ireland Intermediate Club Hurling Championship
All-Ireland Intermediate Club Hurling Championship
All-Ireland Intermediate Club Hurling Championship